The 1965 San Diego State Aztecs football team represented San Diego State College during the 1965 NCAA College Division football season.

San Diego State competed in the California Collegiate Athletic Association (CCAA). The team was led by head coach Don Coryell, in his fifth year, and played home games at both Aztec Bowl and Balboa Stadium.

The Aztecs were nationally rated as high as number 3 in the AP Small College Football Poll, but dropped out of the top 10 after their loss to Cal State Long Beach.  They finished the season with eight wins and two losses (8–2, 3–2 CCAA). The offense scored over 40 points in a game six times, totaling 353 points during the season. The defense had five shutouts, giving up only 87 points in 10 games.

Schedule

Team players in the NFL/AFL
The following San Diego State players were selected in the 1966 NFL Draft.

The following San Diego State players were selected in the 1966 AFL Draft.

The following finished their San Diego State career in 1965, were not drafted, but played in the NFL/AFL.

Team awards

Notes

References

San Diego State
San Diego State Aztecs football seasons
San Diego State Aztecs football